Acanthopteroctetes aurulenta is a moth of the family Acanthopteroctetidae. It was described by Davis in 1984. It is found in north-western Oregon and central Utah.

The wingspan is about 7.4 mm for males and 5.1 mm for females. The forewings are uniformly pale golden brown. The hindwings are thinly scaled and uniformly pale gray. Adults have been recorded in July and August.

References

Moths described in 1984
Biota of Oregon
Biota of Utah
Moths of North America
Acanthoctesia
Taxa named by Donald R. Davis (entomologist)